is a Japanese football player who plays as Goalkeeper and currently play for Verspah Oita on the Japan Football League.

Career
In 2022, Sato joined to Hokkaido Soccer League club, BTOP Thank Kuriyama for 2022 season.

On 27 February 2023, Sato announcement officially transfer to JFL club, Verspah Oita for ahead of 2023 season.

Career statistics

Club
Updated to 1 March 2023.

References

External links

Profile at Fujieda MYFC

1997 births
Living people
Sanno Institute of Management alumni
Association football people from Kanagawa Prefecture
Japanese footballers
J3 League players
Japan Football League players
Fujieda MYFC players
Suzuka Point Getters players
J.FC Miyazaki players
Verspah Oita players
Association football goalkeepers